Like the Leaves (Italian:Come le foglie) is a 1935 Italian drama film directed by Mario Camerini and starring Isa Miranda, Mimì Aylmer and Nino Besozzi. It was based on a play by Giuseppe Giacosa. The film radically altered the image of Miranda from her previous film Everybody's Woman (1934) in which she had played a glamorous film star. In this case she appeared as a modest middle-class woman. Miranda was widely praised for her performance, further enhancing her status as the leading Italian actress.

Synopsis
After their father is ruined financially, his middle-class children go out to work. While most struggle, his daughter Nennele proves to be an unexpected success.

Cast
 Isa Miranda as Nennele 
 Mimì Aylmer as Giulia 
 Nino Besozzi as Max 
 Ernesto Sabbatini as Giovanni Rosani 
 Cesare Bettarini as Tommy 
 Achille Majeroni as Commander Casati 
 Romolo Costa as Zoffoli 
 Amina Pirani Maggi as Elena 
 Michele Riccardini as Bernabei 
 Ernesto Olivieri as Helmer Strile 
 Amilcare Pettinelli as Advocat Riccardo Janni 
 Albino Principe as Young Piano Player

References

Bibliography 
 Gundle, Stephen. Mussolini's Dream Factory: Film Stardom in Fascist Italy. Berghahn Books, 2013.

External links 
 

1935 films
Italian drama films
Italian black-and-white films
1935 drama films
1930s Italian-language films
Films directed by Mario Camerini
Italian films based on plays
Films based on works by Giuseppe Giacosa
1930s Italian films